David White is a British make-up artist.

He was nominated at the 87th Academy Awards in the category of Best Makeup and Hairstyling for his work on the film Guardians of the Galaxy. His nomination was shared with Elizabeth Yianni-Georgiou.

David is the owner of the company Altered States FX

References

External links

https://web.archive.org/web/20150325161827/http://www.alteredstatesfx.co.uk/about_asfx.htm
https://finance.yahoo.com/news/most-complex-makeup-guardians-galaxy-121400471.html (interview about Guardians of the Galaxy)

Living people
Year of birth missing (living people)
British make-up artists
Place of birth missing (living people)